12 (+6) In a Row is an album by Paul Bley with Hans Koch and Franz Koglmann recorded in Switzerland in 1990 and released on the hat ART label the following year.

Reception

Thom Jurek of AllMusic states, "In all, this is one of Bley's most curious and intimate works, where his own musical mind is given problems -- presented by serialism and its own undoing -- and his ways of resolving them or casting them out of his vocabulary. Brilliant".
The Guardian review by John Fordham awarded the album 4 stars noting "This is perhaps predominantly a set for free-jazz fans; however, it's jostling with absorbing melody, and all 18 tracks are invitingly short".

Track listing
All compositions by Paul Bley, Hans Koch & Franz Koglmann except as indicated
 "Solo 1" (Bley) - 3:13
 "Trio 1" - 3:37
 "Solo 2" (Bley) - 3:34
 "Trio 2" - 2:22
 "Solo 3" (Bley) - 3:27
 "Trio 3" - 3:04
 "Duo 1" (Bley, Koch) - 1:59
 "Duo 2" (Bley Koch) - 1:58
 "Duo 3" (Bley, Koglmann) - 2:17
 "Solo 4" (Bley) - 4:27
 "Trio 4" - 2:59
 "Solo 5" (Bley) - 3:47
 "Trio 5" - 4:57
 "Solo 6" (Bley) - 4:57
 "Trio 6" - 4:28
 "Solo 7" (Bley) - 2:37
 "Trio 7" - 2:20
 "Solo 8" (Bley) - 3:07

Personnel 
Paul Bley - piano
Franz Koglmann - flugelhorn 
Hans Koch - clarinet, saxophone

References 

1991 albums
Paul Bley albums
Hathut Records albums